Pilisphaerion exoticum is a species of beetle in the family Cerambycidae, the only species in the genus Pilisphaerion.

References

Elaphidiini